2011 Denmark Open is a darts tournament, which took place in Denmark in 2011.

Results

Last 32

References

2011 in darts
2011 in Danish sport
Darts in Denmark